The Furies (Erinyes) are the deities of vengeance in Greek mythology.

Furies may also refer to:

Films
 The Furies (1930 film), a murder mystery
 The Furies, a film montage by Slavko Vorkapić which opened the 1934 film Crime Without Passion
 The Furies (1950 film), a Western by Anthony Mann
 The Furies (2016 film), a Spanish film

Print media
 The Furys, a 1935 novel by James Hanley, see The Furys Chronicle
 "The Furies", a short story in the 1954 collection Appleby Talking by Michael Innes
 "The Furies", a 1965 science fiction novelette by Roger Zelazny
 The Furies (Roberts novel), a 1966 science fiction novel by Keith Roberts
 The Furies (Jakes novel), a 1976 historical novel by John Jakes
 The Furies, a 2009 historical novel by Bill Napier
 The Furies, a newspaper of The Furies Collective, a Washington DC-based lesbian organization

Characters
 Erinyes (Dungeons & Dragons), a devil in the Dungeons & Dragons role-playing game
 Furies (Shannara), characters in the Shannara book series by Terry Brooks 
 The Furies, characters in the Codex Alera book series by Jim Butcher

Other
 The Furies (band), an American indie rock band
 The Eumenides, or The Furies, a play by Aeschylus

See also
 Female Furies, a group of women warriors in DC Comics
 The Furys (disambiguation)
 The Fureys, Irish folk band
 Fury (disambiguation)